Hardware Park is a Special Economic Zone located at Shamshabad in Hyderabad. The Industries in Hardware Park include Tata Teleservices, Centre for Development of Advanced Computing (C-DAC), HCL TalentCare Pvt Ltd, Zen Technologies, Sigma Microsystems Pvt Ltd etc. It is promoted by TSIIC. It has an area of 1700 acres.

References

Special Economic Zones of India
Economy of Telangana
Economy of Hyderabad, India
Business parks of India